The Alfa Romeo 182 is a Formula One car that was used by the Alfa Romeo team during the 1982 Formula One season.

Design 
Alfa Romeo used three different models throughout 1982: the 179D (2 entries), the 182 (28 entries) and the 182B (2 entries); all with Alfa Romeo 3.0 L V12 engines.

At a time when downforce-generating tunnels were virtually unlimited in dimensions, designer Mario Tollentino chose to use smaller tunnels that did not pass through the rear drive halfshafts, with only the lower suspension control arms intruding into the low-pressure area, making for a very clean and efficient airflow.

The 182B variant was tested for the first time at the 1982 Belgian Grand Prix at Zolder; this version was  narrower and had a new exhaust and side skirts.

At the Italian Grand Prix, a turbo variant of this car, designated 182T, which carried a V8 turbo engine was tested by Andrea de Cesaris. It was not used in the race though. This version was derived from the 182D version. The 182T was converted to one of five 183Ts later next year.

Competition History 
The car made its debut at the 1982 Brazilian Grand Prix. The best race was at Monaco, where de Cesaris placed 3rd.

Complete Formula One results
(key) (results in bold indicate pole position)

References

182